Hendrick V. Fisher (October 15, 1846 – April 19, 1909) was an American businessman and politician.

Fisher was born in Wilkes-Barre, Pennsylvania. He went to Wyoming Seminary and then worked for the railroad in the office as a clerk. In 1868, Fisher moved to Aurora, Illinois. Fisher then settled in Geneseo, Illinois in 1869. Fisher was involved with the general merchandise business. He was also involved with the manufacture of hardware and stoves. Fisher served in the Illinois House of Representatives from 1887 to 1891 and was a Republican. Fisher also served in the Illinois Senate from 1895 to 1899. He served as president pro tempore of the senate in 1897. From 1889 to 1893, Fisher served as aide-de-camp on the staff of Illinois Governor Joseph W. Fifer and was commissioned a colonel. Fisher died in Excelsior Springs, Missouri after suffering a stroke. Fisher was the great-great grandson of Hendrick Fisher who was involved with Rutgers University.

Notes

External links

1846 births
1909 deaths
Politicians from Wilkes-Barre, Pennsylvania
People from Geneseo, Illinois
Wyoming Seminary alumni
Military personnel from Illinois
Businesspeople from Illinois
Republican Party members of the Illinois House of Representatives
Republican Party Illinois state senators
19th-century American politicians
19th-century American businesspeople